Joan Lee Tu (b. 1981) is a Canadian linguist, data scientist, and medical student. Her Master of Arts thesis entitled What does txting do 2 language: The influences of exposure to messaging and print media on acceptability constraints (2011) made a notable contribution to the academic literature on text messaging. The thesis used acceptability judgment tasks to test a relationship between exposure to text messaging and word acceptance. It received international media attention.

Lee's lesser known works include the paper The opacity of s-irregular verbs in Korean:  Confronting Optimality Theory approaches (2011)  which was written in 2005, and later published in the Calgary Papers in Linguistics. Lee also presented the paper The distribution of Turkish articles: Implications for L2 English at the Linguistic Society of America 2006 Summer Meeting in East Lansing, Michigan.

References

External links
 Video of interview, Andrea MacLean, CTV Calgary Morning Live, March 14, 2012
 Frequency vs. Dictionary, Joan Lee, November 14, 2012

Living people
Linguists from Canada
1981 births
Women linguists